Laura Malosetti Costa (born 30 March 1956) is a Uruguayan-born Argentine social and cultural anthropologist, researcher, art historian, and essayist. She is also a curator of art exhibitions and the author of several books on Latin American art. She was recognized with the Konex Award in 2006 and 2016.

Career
Laura Malosetti Costa was born 30 March 1956 in Montevideo, Uruguay. She completed a doctorate at the University of Buenos Aires.

She is a member of the Argentine . She works as a researcher at the National Scientific and Technical Research Council (CONICET), and is director of the Institute of Arts of the National University of General San Martín (UNSAM). She is also UNSAM's director of the Master's Degree in History of Argentine and Latin American Art.

Works
 
  Co-author with Andrea Giunta.
  Collective work.
 
  Collective work.
 
  Collective work.
 
  Co-author with Marcela Gene.
  Compiler.
  Compiled in collaboration with Marcela Gene.
  Co-author with Gabriel Peluffo Linari.
  Co-author with Marcela Gene.
 
  Co-author with María de la Paz López Carvajal and Pablo Montini.
  Co-author with Cristina Rossi.
  Co-author with María Isabel Baldasarre.
 
  Collective work.
 
  Collective work.
  Collective work.
  Collective work.

Awards and recognitions
 FIAAR Award from Telefónica for art history research, 1998
 Honorable Mention of the Latin American Association of Art, 2003
 Best Book of the Year from the Argentine Association of Art Critics, 2006
 Konex Award Diploma of Merit for Aesthetics, Theory, and Art History, 2006
 Curator's Prize for Exhibition,  Argentine Association of Art Critics, 2007
 Juror for the National Production Awards, 2013
 Konex Jury Award for Humanities, 2016

References

External links
 Laura Malosetti Costa at Academia.edu

1956 births
21st-century Argentine women writers
21st-century Argentine writers
Argentine art historians
Argentine women essayists
Argentine essayists
Argentine art curators
Living people
University of Buenos Aires alumni
Uruguayan expatriates in Argentina
Women art historians
Writers from Montevideo